Oknha Lau Ming Kan (born 1 January 1944, ; ; also spelt Lau Meng Khin or Lao Meng Khin) is a Cambodian senator and businessman. He owns Pheapimex, a major conglomerate with his wife Choeung Sopheap. The majority of his fortune comes from logging and other sectors, including lucrative joint ventures with Chinese investors.

Business interests 
Meng Khin's businesses have been linked to controversies. He owns Shukaku, which was responsible for forcible land evictions at Boeung Kak lake. In February 2007, the Phnom Penh municipality awarded Shukaku with a 99-year lease to fill in and develop the lake, which impacted 4,250 families. awarded His firm Pheapimex owns Cambodia's largest land concession. He was awarded the title of Oknha in 2006.

Personal life 
Meng Khin is a Chinese Cambodian of Teochew descent. He is married to Choeung Sopheap. They both hold Cypriot citizenship. He has several children, including Lau Vann, "Michelle" Lau Sok Huy, and "Alex" Lau Zhong Yao. His biological son Lau Vann is married to Meng Khin's step-daughter, Choeung Sokuntheavy.

Meng Khin's family has courted significant scrutiny for their significant wealth, including properties in Australia. The family also has significant business and marriage ties to the children of Hun Sen.

References 

Cambodian businesspeople
21st-century Cambodian politicians
Cambodian People's Party politicians
Living people
People from Phnom Penh
Members of the National Assembly (Cambodia)
Members of the Senate (Cambodia)
Cambodian people of Chinese descent
1944 births
Cambodian politicians of Chinese descent
People of Chaoshanese descent
Cypriot people of Cambodian descent